Clément Castets (born 5 May 1996) is a French rugby union player, who plays as a loosehead prop for Stade Français in the Top 14.

Club career
On 26 August 2017, Clément Castets played his first game for Toulouse. Next seasons, he won the 2018–19 Top 14 and the 2020–21 Top 14 as well as the 2020–21 Champions Cup.

On 10 May 2021, he chose to leave his first professional club and signed with Stade Français. He joined the French capital side at the end of the 2020–21 Top 14 season.

International career
On 17 October 2022, Castets was first called by Fabien Galthié to the France national team for the Autumn internationals.

Honours

Toulouse
 European Rugby Champions Cup: 2020–21
 Top 14: 2018–19, 2020–21

References

External links
 Stade Français
 EPCR
 All.Rugby
 It's Rugby

1996 births
People from Toulouse
Living people
French rugby union players
Rugby union props
Stade Toulousain players
Stade Français players